Ceylon Government Railway Class S1 is a class of diesel multiple unit train-set built by English Electric for Ceylon Government Railway.

Description
These units arrived Ceylon, Now Sri Lanka in 1938. Three units were given the names Silver Foam (501), Silver Spray (502) and Silver Mist (503). Their inaugural run from Colombo Fort Station to Galle took place on 25 February 1938. These train-sets were used only on the Coastal Line (Sri Lanka). These train-sets served CGR for about 19 years and then all train-sets were scrapped in 1955.

In 1955, two diesel locomotives named Class M3 589 and 590 were built locally using the prime movers of scrapped S1 sets.

See also 

Sri Lanka Railways

References 

S1
Train-related introductions in 1938